Amelia Earhart (1897–1937) was an American aviation pioneer and author.

Amelia Earhart may also refer to:

 Amelia Rose Earhart (born 1983), pilot and news anchor for the NBC affiliate in Denver, Colorado, who recreated the 1937 flight that the original Earhart vanished on in 2014
 Amelia Earhart Birthplace, a historic building in Kansas where the aviator was born
 Amelia Earhart (miniseries), a 1976 two-part television miniseries
 Amelia Earhart: The Final Flight, a 1994 television film
 "Amelia Earhart's Last Flight", a 1937 song by Red River Dave McEnery
 USNS Amelia Earhart (T-AKE-6), a US Navy cargo ship
 SS Amelia Earhart, a US Liberty ship built during World War II
 Amelia Earhart Airport, a public-use airport in Kansas
 Amelia Earhart Bridge, a truss bridge over the Missouri River
 Amelia Earhart Park, an urban park in metropolitan Miami
 Amelia Earhart Peak, a mountain in California

See also 
In Search of Amelia Earhart, an album by Plainsong (1972)